The Hardy Boys is a mystery television series, based on the long-running novels of the same name that originally aired from September 23 until December 16, 1995. It was co-produced by New Line Television (a division of New Line Cinema), Nelvana Ltd. (Canada), and Marathon Productions, S.A. (France) in association with Westcom Entertainment Group Ltd. of Canada and France 2.

The show stars Paul Popowich as Joe Hardy and Colin Gray as Frank Hardy, with Fiona Highet cast as Kate Craigen. Tracy Ryan, who starred as the title character in the company's contemporaneous adaptation of the Nancy Drew novels, also made two crossover appearances as Drew.

Cast
Paul Popowich as Joe Hardy
Fiona Highet as Kate Craigen
Colin Gray as Frank Hardy

Home media
On May 9, 2006, The Hardy Boys: The Complete First Season was released as a two-disc DVD set by kaBoom! Entertainment Inc.

Episodes

References

External links

1990s Canadian drama television series
1995 American television series debuts
1995 American television series endings
English-language television shows
First-run syndicated television programs in the United States
Television shows based on American novels
1990s American mystery television series
1995 Canadian television series debuts
1995 Canadian television series endings